Pooja Devariya (born 29 July 1991) is an Indian theatre and film actor as well as a performance coach who works primarily in Tamil films, alongside a Kannada film. She started her film acting career with Selvaraghavan’s Mayakkam Enna, and has gone on to win several awards including Vikatan’s Best Supporting Actress award for her performance in Kuttrame Thandanai.

Pooja is also the founder and creative director of Scout & Guide Media, an actors’ studio & production house, with her partner Sumanth Shetty.

Early life
Pooja Devariya was born on 29 July 1991, to Balu Namasivayam and Pushpa Devariya in Bengaluru, India. She also goes by the patronym, Pooja Balu. A big part of her formative years was spent in Abacus Montessori School, Chennai, to which Pooja credits her personality development and healthy curiosity. She is also a jazz and ballet dancer, having trained in Jeffery Vardon’s Hotshoe Dance Academy, alongside silambattam, a martial arts style from Tamil Nadu which she was trained in by Pandian Master, well-known trainer in Tamil film industry. In addition, she is an accomplished rower and is a National Rowing Medalist

Career
Starting in various minor roles and as a dancer to eventually starring alongside some of Tamil film industry’s biggest names, Pooja’s acting career spans the theatre and film industry over 10 years.

Theatre
After working with many theatre groups in Chennai in various capacities, Pooja became the principal actor and one of the directors with the theatre company Stray Factory This association lasted till 2016, during which time she was the recipient of numerous acting and directing awards including Short+Sweet Theatre Festival’s Best Actress Award for Stray Factory’s Carpouram. Pooja was to forge a strong connection with the founder of Short + Sweet Theatre Festival franchise, Mark Cleary. His guidance and mentorship drove Pooja to expand her repertoire and perform her plays in multiple countries. One such performance of her play, My name is Cine-maa in Hollywood won her the Emerging Artist Award and also bagged her multiple Best Actress awards in Chennai, Mumbai and Malaysia

It was during this time that she also worked under director Yosup Bae (Founder and Director of Tuida) in South Korea for a physical theatre performance titled Bahuchara Matha (Beyond Binary). This collaboration solidified her as a performance-focused actor and Pooja considers Yosup Bae to be a big influence on her acting trajectory.

Films
Pooja’s entry into the Tamil Film Industry was in 2011, when she played the role of Dhanush’s friend Padmini in Selvaraghavan’s Mayakkam Enna, She was widely praised for her portrayal of Malarvizhi in the 2016 Karthik Subbaraj
flick Iraivi She won the Behindwoods Gold Medal for Best Actress Critics Choice for this role.

The same year, her performance in M. Manikandan’s Kuttrame Thandanai received rave reviews bagging her yet another gold medal from Behindwoods and the Best Supporting Actress award from the prestigious Vikatan Awards.

In 2018, Pooja made her Kannada debut with the film Kadheyondu Shruvagide, directed
by Senna Hegde

Performance coaching
In 2020, Pooja Devariya founded Scout & Guide Media with her partner Sumanth Shetty. An actors’ studio & production house, Pooja’s work with Scout & Guide Media involves training new and established actors, and being the bridge between the director’s vision and the actor’s performance
While the concept of a performance coach is very prevalent in Hollywood and European films, it is a relatively recent
phenomenon in the Indian Film Industry.
Pooja worked extensively with director Bharat Bala on Netflix’s anthology, Navarasa The entire title sequence was shot using Bolt, a robot used for extremely high-speed cameras. Pooja helped Bharat Bala figure out the best acting techniques/expressions that can work in this set up for the title sequence

Her most notable work in this field has been for Lokesh Kanagaraj’s 2022 Kamal Haasan starrer Vikram, in which she was the performance coach for Vijay Sethupathi with particular emphasis on his unique body language for this role. Her association with Vijay Sethupathi has been a long one and she is his performance coach for both the upcoming Sriram Raghavan film Merry Christmas and Kishor Pandurang Belekar’s upcoming silent feature Gandhi Talks.

Filmography
All films are in Tamil, unless otherwise noted.

As Performance Coach

Awards & Nominations
Films

References

External links 

Living people
Actresses in Tamil cinema
Actresses from Chennai
Indian film actresses
21st-century Indian actresses
1991 births